Pleurostoma is a genus of fungi in the family Pleurostomataceae containing 2 species.

References

External links 

Sordariomycetes genera
Calosphaeriales